Thomas Stanley (born 7 December 1962) is an English former professional footballer who played as a midfielder in the Football League for York City and in non-League football for Elm Valley, Upton Juniors, Rowntree Mackintosh, Harrogate Railway Athletic and Pickering Town. He had a spell as player-manager of Selby Town.

References

1962 births
Living people
People from Hemsworth
English footballers
Association football midfielders
York City F.C. players
Nestlé Rowntree F.C. players
Selby Town F.C. players
Harrogate Railway Athletic F.C. players
Pickering Town F.C. players
English Football League players
English football managers
Pickering Town F.C. managers